Milton Township is a township in Butler County, Kansas, USA.  As of the 2000 census, its population was 1,136.

History
Milton Township was created in 1873. It was named for Milton C. Snorf, a pioneer settler.

Geography
According to the USGS, it contains three cemeteries: Brainerd, Harder and Swiss. The stream of Dry Creek runs through this township.

Further reading

References

External links
 Butler County Website
 City-Data.com
 Butler County Maps: Current, 1936

Townships in Butler County, Kansas
Townships in Kansas